This is a list in alphabetical order of cricketers who have played for Badureliya Sports Club in first-class matches. Where there is an article, the link comes before the club career span, and the scorecard name (typically initials and surname) comes after. If no article is present, the scorecard name comes before the span.

A
 Dunil Abeydeera (2010–11) : R. D. Abeydeera
 A. K. V. Adikari (2014–15)
 G. K. Amarasinghe (2020–21)
 H. S. Amarasinghe (2022–23)
 D. Amarnath (2012–13)
 Subramanian Anand (2009–10 to 2018–19) : S. Anand
 Sahan Adeesha (2015–16) : W. S. A. Appuhami
 D. A. R. Aravinda (2022)
 U. K. D. Aravinda (2008–09)
 Duncan Arnolda (2008–09 to 2009–10) : D. F. Arnolda
 K. B. Arun Karthik (2007–08)
 M. N. M. Aslam (2022)
 Amal Athulathmudali (2014–15) : D. N. A. Athulathmudali
 T. P. Attanayake (2009–10 to 2010–11)

References

Badureliya Sports Club